Love Monster is an animated children's television series that premiered on CBeebies on 27 January 2020. It is based on the books by Rachel Bright. It focuses on the misadventures of the titular monster and his friends. It premiered on December 18, 2020 on HBO Max as a Max Original in the United States and then one year later on Cartoon Network's Cartoonito block on September 19, 2021. It was removed in September 2022.

Books by Rachel Bright
 Love Monster
 Love Monster and the Scary Something
 Love Monster and the Last Chocolate
 Love Monster and the Perfect Present
 Love Monster and the Extremely Big Wave

Voice cast
 Darren Foreman as Love Monster
 Tamsin Greig as the Narrator
 Javone Prince as Bad Idea Puppy
 Sarah Hadland as Tiniest Fluffiest Bunny
 Lewis MacLeod as Elder Kitten and Dr. G. Piggles
 George Takei as Elder Panda
 Freya Parker as The In-Chicks and Delivery Duckling
 Emma Maclennan as Book Cub

Episodes

Season 1

References

External links
 
 

2020 British television series debuts
2020s British animated television series
2020s British children's television series
2020 Canadian television series debuts
2020s Canadian animated television series
2020s Canadian children's television series
BBC children's television shows
British children's animated adventure television series
British flash animated television series
British preschool education television series
British television shows based on children's books
Canadian children's animated adventure television series
Canadian flash animated television series
Canadian preschool education television series
Canadian television shows based on children's books
English-language television shows
Cartoon Network original programming
Cartoonito original programming
Animated television series about monsters
CBeebies
Television series by Boat Rocker Media
Animated preschool education television series
2020s preschool education television series
CBC Kids original programming